The 1954 Montana State Bobcats football team was an American football team that represented Montana State University in the Rocky Mountain Conference (RMC) during the 1954 college football season. In its third season under head coach Tony Storti, the team compiled an 8–1 record (6–0 against RMC opponents) and won the Rocky Mountain Conference championship.

Schedule

References

Montana State
Montana State Bobcats football seasons
Rocky Mountain Athletic Conference football champion seasons
Montana State Bobcats football